Hay Day is a freemium mobile farming game developed and published by Supercell. Hay Day was released for iOS on 21 June 2012 and Android on 20 November 2013. According to a 2013 report, Supercell earned $30 million a month from Hay Day and Clash of Clans. In 2013, Hay Day was the fourth highest game in revenue generated.

Gameplay

The player's uncle is unable to take care of his farm anymore, so he hands over the responsibility of caring for the farm to the player. The game starts with a scarecrow giving the player a farming tutorial. By selling crops/products, the player earns coins which can be used to buy production buildings, pets and decoration items. By doing so, they also earn experience points (XP), with which they level up. As they progress, the player is eventually introduced to Angus, a friend of the player's uncle who gives a fishing tutorial. Earlier on, the player is also introduced to an NPC named Greg, who arrives at the player's farm requesting items, or puts items in his "roadside shop" which players can buy.

Players form into small "neighborhoods", in which the members can assist each other when in need (for example, by requesting multiple items) and can also chat with one another. Players can also trade their goods with the other friends or neighbors from the neighbourhood. Players in the neighborhood can also participate in "derbies", in which each member will be able to take on certain tasks with a time limit. Getting the tasks done in the given amount of time will put your neighbourhood ahead of other competing neighborhoods. And players will be rewarded with farm items to collect at the end of Derby each week.

Reception
Gamezebo gave it 4/5, noting its similarity to Farmville and praising the graphics. Pocket Gamer gave it a bronze award.

References

2012 video games
Android (operating system) games
IOS games
Strategy video games
Video games developed in Finland
Farming video games
Supercell (video game company) games